Viviani is a surname. Notable people with the surname include:

 Anselmo Viviani (1915–?), Italian cross-country skier
 Antonio Viviani (1560–1620), painter
 Attilio Viviani (born 1996), Italian cyclist
 Elia Viviani (born 1989), cyclist
 Fabio Viviani (chef) (born 1978)
 Fabio Viviani (footballer) (born 1966)
 Federico Viviani (footballer born 1981)
 Federico Viviani (footballer born 1992)
 Guillermo Viviani (1893–1964), Chilean Roman Catholic priest and trade unionist 
 Giovanni Buonaventura Viviani (1638–1693), composer and violinist
 Jody Viviani (born 1982), footballer
 Luigi Viviani (disambiguation), multiple people
 Ottavio Viviani (c. 1579–c. 1641), painter
 Raffaele Viviani  (1888–1950), author, playwright, and actor
 René Viviani (1863–1925), French politician and prime minister
 Vincenzo Viviani (1622–1703), mathematician and scientist
 Tanios Viviani (born 1961), entrepreneur

See also
 Square René Viviani
 Stadio Alfredo Viviani
 Viviani (crater)
 Viviani's curve
 Viviani's theorem

Italian-language surnames